Alewife Brook Parkway is a short parkway in Cambridge and Somerville, Massachusetts. It is listed on the National Register of Historic Places. It begins at Fresh Pond in Cambridge (linking to Fresh Pond Parkway via Concord Avenue), and heads north on the east bank of Alewife Brook, crossing into West Somerville and ending at the Mystic River on the Medford town line, where it becomes Mystic Valley Parkway. The entire length of Alewife Brook Parkway is designated as part of Massachusetts Route 16 (Route 16), while the southernmost sections are also designated as part of Route 2 and U.S. Route 3 (US 3). It is managed by the Department of Conservation and Recreation with the Massachusetts Department of Transportation responsible for bridge maintenance.

Route description
The southern terminus of the parkway is the westernmost of the two Fresh Pond rotaries, with Concord Avenue connecting the parkway to Fresh Pond Parkway at the eastern rotary.  The road is designated Massachusetts Routes 2 (northbound) and 16 (eastbound), and US Route 3 (northbound).  The parkway runs roughly north, skirting just east of the Alewife T station to a large intersection (formerly a rotary), where the limited access highway carrying Route 2 to the west begins.  The parkway runs north from this intersection, paralleling just east of the course of Alewife Brook, which forms the western boundary of Cambridge with Arlington.  The first major intersection is with Massachusetts Avenue,  which carries Massachusetts Route 2A eastward toward Porter Square, and Routes 2A and 3 westward into Arlington.  The parkway continues to parallel Alewife Brook as it heads north into Somerville.  After crossing Broadway, the parkway passes through a rotary-like interchange with Powder House Boulevard.  It then passes Dilboy Stadium, on the left, and reaches its northern terminus at a small rotary near where Alewife Brook empties into the Mystic River.  There it meets Mystic Valley Parkway, which runs from Arlington just to the west to Medford to the northeast.  The Route 16 designation continues northeast.  The parkway's total length is just over two miles (about three kilometers).

History
The parkway, with the surrounding Alewife Brook Reservation, forms part of the Metropolitan Park System of Greater Boston, established in 1893. It was originally planned by landscape architect Charles Eliot as one section of a web of pleasure roads designed for their aesthetics. Nearby Alewife Brook was straightened and channelized between 1909 and 1912, and construction of the parkway was completed by 1916. Landscaping was performed by the famed Olmsted Brothers firm.  Route 2 connected to Alewife Brook Parkway as a highway in the present right-of-way at some point before 1937.

A drive-in theater was built in 1950, replaced by the Fresh Pond Shopping Center in 1962.  The current indoor movie theater next to the shopping center was added in 1964.

Along the southern end, Alewife Brook Parkway underwent further changes beginning in the late 1980s, including a new four lane overpass spanning the Fitchburg Line, new dedicated shoulder turning-lanes for exiting and entering the shopping centers, enlarged roundabouts with obstructive center trees removed, new raised grassy medians down the center of the parkway, and new trees, light poles, and bike lanes integrated into the sidewalks. Some of the other amenities integrated in the new design included accessible ramps and stairs on the northbound side of the bridge leading to the Rindge Towers, new sidewalk access to Alewife station, Alewife Linear Park, bike trail adjacent to Jerry's Pond, and a dedicated road for large trucks to service the shopping areas by passing below the overpass.

As traffic has grown over the past century, the original aesthetics of the parkway's southernmost sections have been largely lost. It is now a section of the principal route between the northwestern suburbs and Boston on the other, and consequently carries a large volume of commuter traffic. The Alewife MBTA station is a prominent feature on the parkway, and there are shopping centers, parking lots, and office and apartment buildings lining the parkway between Alewife station and the southern terminus.

Major intersections

See also
National Register of Historic Places listings in Cambridge, Massachusetts
National Register of Historic Places listings in Somerville, Massachusetts

References

External links

 Massachusetts Department of Conservation and Recreation: Alewife Master Plan

Streets in Cambridge, Massachusetts
Parkways in Massachusetts
Roads on the National Register of Historic Places in Massachusetts
Transportation in Somerville, Massachusetts
U.S. Route 3
National Register of Historic Places in Somerville, Massachusetts
National Register of Historic Places in Cambridge, Massachusetts
Parks on the National Register of Historic Places in Massachusetts